VV d'Olde Veste '54 is an association football club from Steenwijk, Netherlands. It was founded on 24 November 1954.

History 
In the 2000s, Olde Veste played mostly in the Derde Klasse and Tweede Klasse and in the 2010s exclusively in the Eerste Klasse. Since 2022 it plays for the first time in its history in the Vierde Divisie (when it secured promotion still known as Hoofdklasse). The promotion was the consequence of a section championship in the Eerste Klasse.

Head coach 
 Willem Jan Talsma (–2022)
 Klaas Boersma (2022–)

References 

Football clubs in the Netherlands
Steenwijkerland
Association football clubs established in 1954
1954 establishments in the Netherlands
Football clubs in Overijssel